Graciela Borges (born Graciela Noemí Zabala, June 10, 1941) is an Argentine  television and film actress.

Borges was born in Dolores.  Having made her film debut at 14, she has acted in over fifty films and was featured in 2006 in Vogue Paris as "the great actress of Argentine cinema".

In 2002, Borges received her first Silver Condor Award for Best Actress for her role in Lucrecia Martel's highly acclaimed La ciénaga. In 2015, the Argentine Film Critics Association recognized her with a lifetime achievement Silver Condor Award.

Filmography (partial)
 Sugar Harvest (1958)
 The Party Is Over (1960)
 Summer Skin (1961)
 The Terrace (1963)
 Circe (1964)
 Traitors of San Angel (1967)
 Monday's Child (1967)
 El dependiente (1969)
 Heroína (1972)
 Poor Butterfly (1986)
 Kindergarten (1989)
 Funes, un Gran Amor (1993)
 Sobre la Tierra (1998)
 La Ciénaga (2001), a.k.a. The Swamp
 Mercano, el Marciano (2002) (voice),  Mercano the Martian
 ¿Sabés Nadar? (2002)
 A Cada Lado (2005)
 Monobloc (2005)
 Las manos (2006)
 Brother and Sister (2010)
 Miss Tacuarembó (2010)
 Viudas (2011)
 Un Amor en Tiempos de Selfies (2014)
 El Espejo de los Otros (2015)
 Resentimental (2016)
 La Quietud (2018)
 El Cuento de las Comadrejas (2019)

Television (partial)
 Son o se Hacen (1997) TV Series
 Primicias (2000) TV Series
 Infieles (2002) Mini TV Series
 Botines (2005) Mini TV Series

References

External links

 
 
 
 

1941 births
Actresses from Buenos Aires
Argentine film actresses
Argentine television actresses
Argentine voice actresses
Living people
Illustrious Citizens of Buenos Aires